Mamadou Seck may refer to:
Mamadou Seck (politician), President of the National Assembly of Senegal
Mamadou Seck (footballer)